Chloé Briot (born 18 November 1987) is a French operatic soprano.

Life 
Briot was born in Mayenne of parent teachers. She started playing percussion at the age of 4, then started playing the flute and took dance lessons. At the age of 14, the singing teacher at the city's conservatory decided to accept her into her class even though she was too young for the age requirement. She then studied at the Conservatoire de Paris from 2006 onwards, which she left afterwards, judging the atmosphere "too academic". She then went on to study at the Aix-en-Provence Festival, of which she was a laureate in 2014.

In 2018, she was nominated in the "Lyric Artist" category in the Victoires de la musique classique.

In August 2020, she announced that she had filed a complaint for sexual assault.

Opera 
 2014 : Jenůfa by Leoš Janáček, directed by Alvis Hermanis
 2015 : Alcina by Haendel, directed by Pierre Audi
 2015 : The Magic Flute by Mozart, directed by Pet Halmen
 2015 : Le Roi Carotte by Jacques Offenbach, directed by Laurent Pelly
 2016 :  Pelléas et Mélisande by Claude Debussy, directed by René Koering
 2016 : Lakmé by Léo Delibes, directed by 
 2016 : Pelléas et Mélisande, directed by Katie Mitchell
 2016 : Pelléas et Mélisande, directed by Stéphane Braunschweig
 2017 : Pinocchio by Philippe Boesmans, directed by 
 2018 : La Légende du Roi Dragon by Arthur Lavandier, directed by 
 2018 : Pelléas et Mélisande, directed by Stefan Herheim
 2018 : A Midsummer Night's Dream by Felix Mendelssohn, Juliette Deschamps
 2019 : The Magic Flute, directed by Robert Carsen
 2019 : L’Inondation by Francesco Filidei, directed by Joël Pommerat

References

External links 
 
 Chloe Briot on Kunstenpunt

French operatic sopranos
Conservatoire de Paris alumni
1987 births
Living people
People from Mayenne
21st-century French women opera singers